Diego Fortuna (born 14 February 1968) is a retired male discus thrower from Italy.

Biography
He represented his native country in two consecutive Summer Olympics (1996 and 2000). He won the men's discus throw event at the 2001 Mediterranean Games, and set his personal best (64.69 m) on 24 June 2000 at a meet in Ravenna.

Achievements

National titles
Fortuna won 14 national championships at individual senior level.

Italian Athletics Championships
Discus throw: 1994, 1995, 1997, 1998, 1999, 2000, 2001, 2004 (8)
Italian Winter Throwing Championships
Discus throw: 1995, 1998, 1999, 2000, 2003, 2008 (6)

See also
 Italian all-time top lists - Discus throw
 List of Italian records in masters athletics

References

External links
 

1968 births
Living people
Italian male discus throwers
Athletes (track and field) at the 1996 Summer Olympics
Athletes (track and field) at the 2000 Summer Olympics
Olympic athletes of Italy
Universiade medalists in athletics (track and field)
World Athletics Championships athletes for Italy
Italian masters athletes
Mediterranean Games gold medalists for Italy
Mediterranean Games silver medalists for Italy
Mediterranean Games medalists in athletics
Athletes (track and field) at the 1997 Mediterranean Games
Athletes (track and field) at the 2001 Mediterranean Games
Universiade bronze medalists for Italy
Sportspeople from Vicenza
Athletics competitors of Centro Sportivo Carabinieri
Medalists at the 1995 Summer Universiade
20th-century Italian people